Jiju Jacob (born 25 December 1967) is a former Indian International football player who played as a defender. Jiju is from Kozhikode, Kerala and has represented India in several matches including the Nehru Cup in 1997 and the 1998 Bangkok Asian Games. He currently works as a Malayalam co-commentator and pundit on Star Sports network.

Honours

India
SAFF Championship: 1993; runner-up: 1995
 South Asian Games Silver medal: 1993

References

Indian footballers
India international footballers
Malayali people
Footballers from Kerala
People from Kozhikode district
1967 births
Living people
Association football defenders
Association football commentators
Indian sports broadcasters
Footballers at the 1998 Asian Games
Asian Games competitors for India
South Asian Games medalists in football
South Asian Games silver medalists for India